José Vidal (26 May 1938 – 24 July 2019) was a Venezuelan footballer. He played in two matches for the Venezuela national football team in 1967. He was also part of Venezuela's squad for the 1967 South American Championship.

References

1938 births
2019 deaths
Venezuelan footballers
Venezuela international footballers
Place of birth missing
Association football defenders
Asociación Civil Deportivo Lara players